"Helas madam" is a folk song widely attributed to Henry VIII, but which in reality appears in the Bayeux Manuscript, compiled during the final decades of the 15th century. The song is part of a secular collection, found on a manuscript that was used in Henry's court. The originality of the song has been questioned, with various parts of the song allegedly lifted from similar pieces in Europe. The song itself is a courtship conversation in Middle French between a man and woman.

Lyrics

References 

Renaissance music
Works by Henry VIII
Year of song unknown
Songwriter unknown